Agent trouble is a 1987 French film directed by Jean-Pierre Mocky and starring Catherine Deneuve. It is based on the novel The Man Who Loved Zoos by Malcolm Bosse. Dominique Lavanant won the César Award for Best Actress in a Supporting Role for her performance in the film. The film was also nominated at the 1988 César Awards for Best Actress, Best Supporting Actor and Best Music.

Plot 
Amanda Weber is a museum employee. Her nephew, Victorien, who feels that wild animals should not be kept in zoos, has been murdered, and she seeks to find out why and how. She knows that Victorien was witness to a mysterious government project where 50 tourists were killed by an unknown poison gas, and the bus they were travelling in was found at the bottom of a lake. Alex, a callous government assassin who is having marital problems with his wife Delphine, has orders to kill anyone who knows about the cover-up of that project, and Amanda soon becomes his target.

Cast 
Catherine Deneuve - Amanda Weber
Richard Bohringer - Alex
Tom Novembre - Victorien
Dominique Lavanant - Catherine 'Karen' Dariller
Sophie Moyse - Delphine
Kristin Scott Thomas - Julie
Sylvie Joly - Edna
Héléna Manson - Madame Sackman 
Hervé Pauchon - Tony
Charles Varel - Norbert
Maxime Leroux - Doctor Arms
Pierre Arditi - Stanislas Gautier
Antoine Mayor - Tintin
Michel Varille - Tony's boyfriend
Jacques Boudet - The writer
Isabelle Mergault - The waitress
Dominique Zardi - The guardian

Discography
The CD soundtrack composed by Gabriel Yared is available on Music Box Records label (website).

References

External links 

 

1987 films
French thriller films
Films directed by Jean-Pierre Mocky
1980s French-language films
1980s French films
1987 thriller films